Ronald Kingsley Read (19 February 1887February 1975) was one of four contestants chosen to share the prize money for the design of the Shavian alphabet, a completely new alphabet intended for writing English. He was later appointed sole responsible designer of the alphabet.

In 1966, after extensive testing of Shavian with English speakers from around the world, Read introduced Quikscript, a revised form of his Shavian alphabet. Quikscript, also known as the "Read alphabet", has more ligatures than Shavian, which makes it easier to write by hand. Its appearance is more cursive than Shavian.

A few days before his death, he completed a new alphabet called Soundspell (now Readspel), based, probably for increased chances of popular acceptance, on the Latin script.

In the early 1960s Read also produced the quarterly journal Shaw-script, which was printed using the Shavian alphabet.

References

External links
 
 Quikscript io group
 Shavian Yahoo Group

1887 births
1975 deaths
Creators of writing systems